The 1920 All-Big Ten Conference football team consists of American football players selected to the All-Big Ten Conference teams chosen by various selectors for the 1920 Big Ten Conference football season.

All Big-Ten selections

Ends
 Chuck Carney, Illinois (CSM, DL, EA, ECP-1, EOS, HB, HJ, HMD, JW, MM, PD, RA, TL, WE-1)
 Frank Weston, Wisconsin (DL, EA, ECP-1, EOS, FH, FM, HB, JW, PD, RA, TL, WE-1)
 Lester Belding, Iowa (CSM, ECP-2, FM, HJ, MM)
 Frank Hanny, Indiana (FH)
 Gus Eckberg, Minnesota (HMD)

Tackles
 Iolas Huffman, Ohio State (CSM, DL, EA, ECP-1, FH, FM [guard], HJ, JW, PD, RA, TL)
 Angus Goetz, Michigan (DL, EA [guard], HB, JW, MM, PD, RA, TL)
 Duke Slater, Iowa (EA, ECP-2, EOS, HB, HJ, HMD, WE-1)
 Ralph Scott, Wisconsin (ECP-1, FH, MM)
 Elliot C. Risley, Indiana (EOS, MM [guard])
 Tad Wieman, Michigan (FM)
 Jackson, Chicago (CSM)

Guards
 Tarzan Taylor, Ohio State (DL, EA, ECP-2, FH, HB, HMD [tackle], JW, PD, RA, TL)
 Robert J. Dunne, Michigan (CSM, EOS, FH, HMD, PD)
 Charles McGuire, Chicago (CSM, ECP-2 [tackle], FM [tackle], HJ, MM, WE-1 [tackle])
 Festus Tierney, Minnesota (HB, RA, WE-1)
 William G. McCaw, Indiana (EOS, FM)
 George C. Bunge, Wisconsin (DL, ECP-1)
 Dean W. Trott, Ohio State (ECP-1)
 Albert W. T. Mohr, Jr., Illinois (HJ)
 James Brader, Wisconsin (ECP-2)
 Harry Margoles, Wisconsin (HMD)
 Graham Penfield, Northwestern (TL, WE-1)

Centers
 Jack Depler, Illinois (CSM, DL, EA, ECP-1, EOS, FH, FM, HB, HJ, HMD, JW [guard], MM, RA, WE-1)
 Andrew J. Nemecek, Ohio State (ECP-2, JW, TL)
 Ernie Vick, Michigan (PD)

Quarterbacks
 Aubrey Devine, Iowa (CSM [halfback], DL, EA, ECP-1, EOS [halfback], FH, HB, HJ, HMD, MM, PD, RA, WE-1)
 Hoge Workman, Ohio State (CSM, ECP-2, JW, TL)
 Robert H. Fletcher, Illinois (FM)
 Charlie Mathys, Indiana (EOS)

Halfbacks
 Gaylord Stinchcomb, Ohio State (CSM, DL, EA, ECP-2 [end], EOS, FH, FM, HB, HJ, HMD, JW, MM, PD, RA, TL, WE-1)
 Frank Steketee, Michigan (DL, HB, PD, RA, WE-1)
 Alvah Elliott, Wisconsin (ECP-1, JW, MM, TL)
 Arnold Oss, Minnesota (EA, FM, HMD)
 Ralph E. Fletcher, Illinois (ECP-1)
 Laurie Walquist, Illinois (ECP-2, FH)
 Glenn Devine, Iowa (ECP-2)

Fullbacks
 Jack Crangle, Illinois (CSM, DL, EA, ECP-1, FH, HB, HJ, HMD, JW, MM, PD, RA, TL, WE-1)
  Russell S. Williams, Indiana (EOS, HJ [halfback])
 George Gipp, Notre Dame (FM)
 Guy Sundt, Wisconsin (ECP-2)

Key

Bold = consensus choice by a majority of the selectors

Italics = Player whose team was not a member of the Big Ten (certain selectors chose All-Western teams in the geographic sense; others chose All-Western teams in reference to the Western Conference, aka the Big Ten Conference)

CSM = Charles A. Bush in Christian Science Monitor

DL = Deake Leake in Akron Press

EA = Earl C. Arnold, sports editor of Minneapolis Tribune

ECP = E. C. Patterson for Collier's Weekly

EOS = E.O. Stiehm, head coach of Indiana University

FH = Fred Hayner in Chicago Daily News

FM = Frank G. Menke, sporting editor of King Features Syndicate

HB = Harry Bullion in the Detroit Free Press

HJ = Howard Jones, head coach at University of Iowa

HMD = Herbert M. Dustin in Minneapolis Daily News

JW = John Wilce, head coach at Ohio State

MM = Malcolm McLean in the Chicago Evening Post

PD = Prentiss Douglass, assistant coach at University of Michigan

RA = Robert C. Angell, sports editor of The Michigan Daily

TL = The Lantern, Ohio Student University

WE = Walter Eckersall

See also
1920 College Football All-America Team

References

1920 Big Ten Conference football season
All-Big Ten Conference football teams